Fathom Events is an entertainment content provider that broadcasts entertainment events in movie theaters throughout the United States, including Metropolitan Opera Live in HD, the performing arts, major sporting events, and music concerts. 

The company was spun out of National CineMedia in 2013 to focus on live performances that National CineMedia had started presenting; the parent company remained focused on producing advertising for movie theaters, which had been its original business. Fathom Events is owned by AC JV, LLC, a joint venture of AMC Theatres, Cinemark Theatres, and Regal Cinemas, the three largest cinema chains in the United States.

John Rubey was the first CEO of Fathom Events, having previously served as pp president of AEG-TV and Network LIVE. 

In 2014, The Theatre Museum Awards honored Fathom Events with the Awards for Excellence in Theatre History Preservation.

In 2015, Fathom Events was named "Best Distributor in the Americas" and received eight box office awards by the Event Cinema Association (ECA).

Ray Nutt became CEO of Fathom Events in 2017, having previously served as senior vice president of business relations for Regal Entertainment Group, where he sat on the board of directors for Fathom. Prior to that, he grew business for Regal CineMedia and United Artists Theatres.

References

External links

American companies established in 2005
Entertainment companies established in 2005
Event management companies of the United States
AMC Theatres
Regal Entertainment Group
Joint ventures
Companies based in Greenwood Village, Colorado
Corporate spin-offs